Carlos Adrián Sarkissian Balerio (born 13 February 1979) is a Uruguayan former professional footballer who played as a midfielder or winger.

Career
Born in Montevideo, Sarkissian began his career with River Plate de Montevideo, and had a spell with C.D. Veracruz in Mexico. He last played for AS Nancy-Lorraine in France's Ligue 1.

References

External links
 
 

1979 births
Living people
Footballers from Montevideo
Association football midfielders
Uruguayan footballers
Uruguayan people of Armenian descent
Uruguayan Primera División players
Ligue 1 players
Saudi Professional League players
Club Atlético River Plate (Montevideo) players
C.D. Veracruz footballers
Al-Ahli Saudi FC players
AS Nancy Lorraine players
Uruguayan expatriate footballers
Uruguayan expatriate sportspeople in Saudi Arabia
Expatriate footballers in Saudi Arabia
Uruguayan expatriate sportspeople in France
Expatriate footballers in France